Awaso is a village near the district capital Bibiani of Bibiani-Anhwiaso-Bekwai Municipal district, a district in the Western North Region of Ghana. Awaso has a bauxite mine operated by the Ghana Bauxite Company. The mine is served by a rail branch line on the western Ghana rail system, however in 2007, much of the ore goes by road.

See also
Railway stations in Ghana

References

External links

 Aluwatch

Populated places in the Western Region (Ghana)